The North Bauchi languages (also called the B.2 West Chadic or Warji languages) are a branch of West Chadic languages that are spoken in Bauchi State, northern Nigeria.

An extensive survey of the North Bauchi (Warji) languages had been done by Skinner (1977).

Culturally, North Bauchi language speakers are unique for their chestharp, a fusion of the arched harp with the chest bow.

Languages
The North Bauchi languages are:

Pa'a
Warji
Diri
Ciwogai
Kariya (Vinahə)
Mburku
Miya
Siri
Zumbun (Jimbin)
Ajawa (†)

Names and locations
Below is a comprehensive list of North Bauchi language names, populations, and locations from Blench (2019).

Reconstruction

Proto-North Bauchi (Proto-Warji) quasi-reconstructions by Roger Blench (2012):

Trees

Antelopes

Crops

Livestock

Liquids

References

West Chadic languages
Languages of Nigeria